Ibrahim Heski or Ibrahim Pasha Haski Tello (? - July 25, 1931, Siah Cheshmeh, Iran), was a Kurdish soldier, politician and president of the Kurdish Republic of Ararat. He was from the Jalali tribe.

Life
His father's name is Hesk and mother's name is Têlî. He was a member of the Hesesori tribe which is one of the blanch of Jalali tribe. Different sources mentioned him as "Ibrahim Agha", "Ibrahim Pasha", "Heskizâde Ibrahim", "Bırho", "Bro Haski Tello", "Bro Haski Talu" and so on. British author and adventurer Rosita Forbes described him as the hero of the region was a wild and gallant freebooter called Ibrahim Agha Huske Tello. During World War I, he fought against Russian troops.

First Ararat Rebellion

In 1925, he participated in the Sheikh Said Rebellion. And after the failure of the rebellion, he fled to Mount Ararat. In 1926, he commanded Hesenan, Jalali, Haydaran tribes and started the First Ararat Rebellion (May 16 - June 17, 1926). On 16 May, Kurdish forces fought against the 28th Infantry Regiment of the 9th Infantry Division of Turkish Army and a Gendarmerie regiment in Demirkapı region. The Turkish troops were defeated and a scattered 28th Regiment had to retreat towards Doğubeyazıt. On June 16/17, Ibrahim and his forces were surrounded by the 28th and 34th regiment, but they could escape over Yukarı Demirkapı to Iran.

Republic of Ararat

On October 28, 1927, Xoybûn proclaimed the Independent Kurdistan and Ibrahim became the President of the Republic of Ararat. Before that, he was appointed the governor of the Agirî Province of Kurdistan by Xoybûn. His sons Ilhami, Omer, Davut and his brothers Ahmed, Eyub participated in Ararat rebellion. Ahmed was killed in action and their 100-year-old mother was shot and killed by the Turkish Army. After the suppression of the Ararat rebellion, he retreated with his men to Iran

Maku Rebellion and death

In 1931, intense fighting broke out in the vicinity of Maku between Persian troops and Kurds. The 2nd Brigade of Azerbaijan Division commanded by Colonel Mohammad Ali Khan engaged and Colonel Kalb Ali Khan was sent from Tabriz and Ardabil with reinforcements. On July 25, while fighting in the vicinity of Qara Aineh, the Persian Colonel Kalb Ali Khan was killed in action and Kurds lost three or four important leaders, including Ibrahim and his brother.

Sources

Year of birth unknown
1931 deaths
People from West Azerbaijan Province
Kurdish people from the Ottoman Empire
Turkish Kurdish people
Turkish Kurdish politicians
Deaths by firearm in Iran
Military personnel killed in action
Sheikh Said rebellion
Ararat rebellion
Kurdish nationalists
Kurdish independence activists